Gustavo Pesenti (January 15, 1878 – January 18, 1960) was an Italian general. He was Italian colonial governor of Somaliland.

Biography 
He was a knight of the Military Order of Savoy. He was a recipient of the Bronze Medal of Military Valor. He fought in the Italo-Turkish War, World War I and Second Italo-Ethiopian War.

Publications
 Canti e ritmi arabici, somalici e suhaili, Bollettino della Reale Società Geografica Italiana, 1910. 
 Di alcuni canti arabici e somalici, Bollettino della Reale Società Geografica Italiana, 1912. 
 I canti del “Dikir”, Bollettino della Reale Sociatà Geografica Italiana, 1916. 
 Canti sacri e profani: danze e ritmi degli Arabi dei Somali e dei Suhaili, L'eroica, Milano, 1929.
 Il maresciallo Cadorna condottiero ed animatore del primo esercito nazionale, Regia Stamperia della colonia, Mogadiscio, 1929.
 La musica è mediterranea, L'Eroica, Milano, 1932.
 Danane : nella Somàlia italiano: nel XXV anniversario del combattimento (9-10 febbraio 1907), L'Eroica, Milano, 1932.
 In Palestina e in Siria durante e dopo la Grande Guerra, L'Eroica, Milano, 1932.
 La Prima Divisione Eritrea alla battaglia dell'Ascianghi, L'Eroica, Milano, 1937.
 L'Islam in occidente, L'Eroica, Milano, 1938.
 La svastica infranta: Note e considerazioni sul defunto III Reich, Bertello, 1945
 La muraglia blindata, Bertello, 1947.
 Le guerre coloniali, N. Zanichelli, Bologna, 1947.
 Alla scoperta del continente nero, Demos, Genova, 1950.
 Fronte Kenya (la guerra in A. O. I.-1940-41), Bertello, 1953.

Bibliography

References

External links
 

1878 births
1960 deaths
Italian generals
Knights of the Military Order of Savoy
Recipients of the Bronze Medal of Military Valor
Italian military personnel of the Second Italo-Ethiopian War
Italian military personnel of the Italo-Turkish War